Cambodia–Serbia relations refers to bilateral relations between Cambodia and Serbia. Relations were established in 1956. Cambodia has an embassy in Belgrade. Serbia has a non resident ambassador in Jakarta.

History
The notorious leader of the Khmer Rouge, Pol Pot, worked as part of an international brigade building roads in Yugoslavia in the early 1950s. At the time, Yugoslavia had split from the sphere of the Soviet Union, and Pol Pot was very impressed with the mass mobilization of public works and cultural collectivization of the small communist nation. He recalled the trip with great fondness, and, once he gained power, sought to improve the relationship between Yugoslavia and Kampuchea. Josip Tito, the President of Yugoslavia, visited Cambodia multiple times during the 1960s and 70s. Despite Pol Pot's admiration for Tito and his policies, Tito was critical of the Khmer Rouge and the decision not to support the regime caused tension between Belgrade and Moscow in 1979. However, despite his dislike for the Khmer Rouge regime, Tito did not support the Vietnamese invasion of Cambodia. During the Cold War and prior to the Breakup of Yugoslavia, the nations had embassies in each other's capitals.

Contemporary relations
After a nearly four decade hiatus of official relations, the nations of Cambodia and Serbia announced a reestablishment of bilateral relations in 2011, and the nations promised political support for each other internationally. Cambodia supports Serbia's position on the Kosovo issue, and the government pledged its support for Serbia's territorial integrity.

See also
 Cambodia–Kosovo relations
 Cambodia–Yugoslavia relations
Yugoslavia and the Non-Aligned Movement

References

Serbia
Bilateral relations of Serbia